Akmatbek is a village in the Chüy District of Chüy Region, Kyrgyzstan. The village was known as Plokhotnikovo until 2002. Its population was 202 in 2021. The village belongs to Kegeti rural community (ayyl aymagy).

References

Populated places in Chüy Region